Da jiang was a rank conferred in 1955 to ten veteran leaders of the People's Liberation Army. It was never conferred again and the rank was abolished in 1965 along with all other ranks in the PLA.

When ranks were reintroduced in 1988, the equivalent rank was given a different name Yiji Shangjiang, perhaps so as to differentiate it from the ten original holders of the rank.  Deng Xiaoping was offered the rank, which he, like he did with the rank of Marshal in 1955, declined, citing Chairman Mao's refusal to take the rank of Grand Marshal. Two of the original ten Da Jiang were still alive when ranks were reintroduced in 1988, Tan Zheng and Xiao Jingguang, but both had by then retired and therefore were not given the rank of Yiji Shangjiang. Thus ultimately, no one was ever named to the new rank and it was discontinued in 1994.

List of PLA Grand Generals (Dajiang)
In the official rank made in 1955: 
 Su Yu (粟裕)
 Xu Haidong (徐海东)
 Huang Kecheng (黄克诚)
 Chen Geng (陈赓)
 Tan Zheng (谭政)
 Xiao Jinguang (萧劲光) (Navy)
 Zhang Yunyi (张云逸)
 Luo Ruiqing (罗瑞卿)
 Wang Shusheng (王树声)
 Xu Guangda (许光达)

See also 

 Jiang
 Ranks of the People's Liberation Army

References

Military ranks of the People's Republic of China
Military history of China